On August 9, 2020, a mass shooting occurred at a block party that was being held in the Greenway neighborhood of Washington, D.C. Twenty-two people were shot, one of whom was killed.

Incident
Police state at 12:30 am EDT (4:30 UTC) at least four shooters exchanged gunfire, firing more than a hundred rounds, while hundreds of people attended a block party promoted as the fifth annual "34th-n-EAT". The block party's attendance exceeded the limit of fifty people to a gathering set by Mayor Muriel Bowser in response to COVID-19. Police were present at the block party but did not have enough officers to handle the large crowd.

Victims
The sole fatality was 17-year-old Christopher Brown. Ten men and eleven women received non-fatal injuries including 22-year-old Charlee Brown of the Metropolitan Police Department of the District of Columbia, who was off-duty at the time.

Reaction
Mayor Muriel Bowser stated "We had a lot of people in a dangerous situation last night. Sadly several people that have no regards for human life opened fire. When you put illegal guns in the hands of people willing to use them it means that some person could lose her life or some people could lose their lives. So it is very important that as a community we have a zero tolerance for this activity, that we support the Metropolitan Police Department, and the community is going to have to understand that may mean that some people will have to go to jail. When we say that we can't have large events, it’s to keep the entire community safe."

References

Block party shooting
2020 mass shootings in the United States
August 2020 crimes in the United States
August 2020 events in the United States
2020 block party